Melanie García Afonso (born 21 September 1990) is a Spanish field hockey player for the Spanish  national team.

She participated at the 2018 Women's Hockey World Cup.

References

1990 births
Living people
Spanish female field hockey players
Female field hockey goalkeepers